Downside Up is a four-disc box set collecting B-sides and bonus material from the catalogue of Siouxsie and the Banshees. Also included (on disc four) is The Thorn EP, originally released in 1984. Most of these songs (only present on these CDs) were classics of the band's live repertoire like "Pulled to Bits", "Eve White/Eve Black", "Red Over White", "I Promise", "Something Blue", "El Día de los Muertos" and "B Side Ourselves". The box set was also released on iTunes.

Reception 
The Times wrote in its review of Downside Up: "Standouts include the spiky 'Drop Dead/Celebration', the sinister 'Eve White/Eve Black' and the chopped up industrial funk of 'Tattoo'". The reviewer rated the band as one of "the most audacious and uncompromising musical adventurers of the post-punk era". Stylus rated it A saying: "It’s a wonderfully eclectic mixture of fingers-down-a-blackboard avant-punk ('Voices (on the Air)', 'Eve White/Eve Black'), Creatures-esque tribal drum-worship ('Sunless'), majestic beauty ('Something Blue', 'Shooting Sun', 'Return'), amusing experimentation ('Slap Dash Snap', '(There's a) Planet in My Kitchen'), linguistic fun ('Mittageisen', 'Il est né, le divin Enfant', 'El Día de los Muertos') and, yes, playfully 'dark' tunes ('Something Wicked (This Way Comes)', 'Are You Still Dying, Darling?')." Record Collector praised the box set for its "remarkable diversity, spontaneity and playfulness", saying that there are "No throwaway tracks". Murray Chalmers commented: "'Drop Dead/Celebration' is still a wonderful explosion of bile aimed at their absconded guitarist and drummer, while 'Slap Dash Snap' is prototype techno." He underlined the diversity of the material: "on more reflective tracks like 'Sea of Light' and 'Let Go' you feel that here is a group who could go anywhere". He stated that "By CD2 they are firing on all cylinders, a pop group thrillingly ahead of the pack, CD3 is immaculate", and considered the four tracks from The Thorn that end the box set as an "orchestrated EP of ferocious intensity". Rock Sound said: "Whilst most bands regard the B-side as an irrelevancy, a dumping ground for throwaway tracks not deemed good enough for proper release, Siouxsie and the Banshees always treated it with respect, an excuse to have fun and experiment." Neil Gardner praised "the sensual menace of 'Tattoo'". Uncut recognized Downside Up as "an exhaustive and fascinating collection from an astonishing group".

NME retrospectively wrote in 2009 : "Manna from heaven for all Siouxsie and the Banshees obsessives, Downside Up is a four-CD box set of the band's B-sides and bonus material, including the spellbinding 'Tattoo' and 'Eve White/Eve Black'."

Legacy 
Tricky covered "Tattoo" as the opening number of his second solo album Nearly God (1996). The original version of "Tattoo", sounds like a pre-trip hop manifesto with a part of the genre's codes; a sweaty atmosphere, whispered voices, humming basses and sounds of fluffy drums. In 1997, Massive Attack sampled "Mittageisen" on "Superpredators" for the soundtrack of The Jackal. Acts from other genres also selected some of these B-sides. Morrissey played "Eve White/Eve Black" during intermission on his 1997's Maladjusted Tour. Shirley Manson of Garbage stated that "Drop Dead/Celebration" was one of her favorite tracks. Jenny Lee Lindberg of Warpaint mentioned her liking for "Umbrella", a song recorded in 1985.

Track listing
All songs by Siouxsie and the Banshees except*

Disc one (1978–1982) 
 "Voices (on the Air)" (Originally the b-side of "Hong Kong Garden")
 "20th Century Boy"* (T. Rex cover) (Originally the b-side of "The Staircase (Mystery)")
 "Pulled to Bits" (Originally the b-side of "Playground Twist")
 "Mittageisen" (Originally the A-side of "Mittageisen")
 "Drop Dead/Celebration" (Originally the b-side of "Happy House")
 "Eve White/Eve Black" (Originally the b-side of "Christine")
 "Red Over White" (Originally the b-side of "Israel")
 "Follow the Sun" (Originally the b-side of "Spellbound")
 "Slap Dash Snap" (Originally the extra b-side of "Spellbound")
 "Supernatural Thing"* (Ben E. King cover) (Originally the b-side of "Arabian Knights")
 "Congo Conga" (Originally the extra b-side of "Arabian Knights")
 "Coal Mind" (Originally the b-side of "Fireworks")
 "We Fall" (Originally the extra b-side of "Fireworks")
 "Cannibal Roses" (Originally the b-side of "Slowdive")
 "Obsession II" (Originally the extra b-side of "Slowdive")
 "A Sleeping Rain" (Originally the extra b-side of "Melt!")
 "Il est né, le divin Enfant"* (traditional 18th century French carol) (Originally the b-side of "Melt!")

Disc two (1983–1987)
 "Tattoo" (Originally the b-side of "Dear Prudence")
 "(There's A) Planet in My Kitchen" (Originally the extra b-side of "Dear Prudence")
 "Let Go" (Originally the b-side of "Swimming Horses")
 "The Humming Wires" (Originally the extra b-side of "Swimming Horses")
 "I Promise" (Originally the b-side of "Dazzle")
 "Throw Them to the Lions" (Originally the extra b-side of "Dazzle")
 "An Execution" (Originally the b-side of "Cities in Dust")
 "The Quarterdrawing of the Dog" (Originally the extra b-side of"Cities in Dust")
 "Lullaby" (Originally the b-side of "Candyman")
 "Umbrella" (Originally the extra b-side of "Candyman")
 "Shooting Sun" (Originally the b-side of "This Wheel's on Fire")
 "Sleepwalking (On the High Wire)" (Originally the extra b-side of "This Wheel's on Fire")
 "She Cracked"* (The Modern Lovers cover) (Originally the extra b-side of "This Wheel's on Fire" 1987 double-pack 7-inch)
 "She's Cuckoo" (Originally the b-side of "The Passenger")
 "Something Blue" (Originally the extra b-side of "The Passenger")
 "The Whole Price of Blood" (Originally the b-side of "Song from the Edge of the World")
 "Mechanical Eyes" (Originally the extra b-side of "Song from the Edge of the World")

Disc three (1988–1995)
 "False Face" (Originally the b-side of "Peek-a-Boo")
 "Catwalk" (Originally the extra b-side of "Peek-a-Boo")
 "Something Wicked (This Way Comes)" (Originally the b-side of "The Killing Jar")
 "Are You Still Dying, Darling?" (Originally the extra b-side of "The Killing Jar")
 "El Día de los Muertos" (Originally the b-side of "The Last Beat of My Heart")
 "Sunless" (Originally the extra b-side of "The Last Beat of My Heart")
 "Staring Back" (Originally the extra b-side of "Kiss Them for Me")
 "Return" (Originally the b-side of "Kiss Them for Me")
 "Spiral Twist" (Originally the b-side of "Shadowtime")
 "Sea of Light" (Originally the extra b-side of "Shadowtime")
 "I Could Be Again" (Originally the b-side of "Face to Face")
 "Hothead" (Originally the extra b-side of "Face to Face")
 "B Side Ourselves" (Originally the b-side of "O Baby")
 "Swimming Horses" (KROQ Acoustic Christmas, 1991) (Originally the extra b-side of "O Baby")
 "All Tomorrow's Parties"* (Velvet Underground cover) (KROQ Acoustic Christmas, 1991) (Originally the extra b-side of "O Baby")
 "Hang Me High" (Originally the b-side of "Stargazer")
 "Black Sun" (Originally the extra b-side of "Stargazer")

Disc Four The Thorn EP (1984)
 "Overground" (Originally from The Thorn)
 "Voices (on the Air)" (Originally from The Thorn)
 "Placebo Effect" (Originally from The Thorn)
 "Red Over White" (Originally from The Thorn)

Three songs were slightly re-edited for the purpose of the box set. "False Face" has a longer introduction with the first singing line repeated. The first seconds of "Hang Me High" were edited out and "Black Sun" has a remodeled end.

References 

B-side compilation albums
2004 compilation albums
Siouxsie and the Banshees compilation albums